"As Jy Met Vuur Speel Sal Jy Brand" , directly translated to "if you play with fire you will burn yourself," is the debut CD of the South African punk rock band Fokofpolisiekar. It is a seven track EP released in 2003 by Rhythm Records in South Africa.

In 2004, it was reissued with a bonus track, "Fokofpolisiekar", and the music video for "Hemel op die platteland". The original version of the EP was released with a white cover, while the reissue had a black one.

Track listing

External links 
Official Fokofpolisiekar website

Fokofpolisiekar albums
2003 EPs